There are 36 Conferences in the United Church of Christ. Most of these consist of associations and all consist of congregations, formally known as "Local Churches."

Puerto Rico was the 39th conference; prior to its affiliation with the Congregational Christian Churches in the 1930s, it was an independent synod/denomination. On June 10, 2006, this conference withdrew from the UCC  .  Effective January 1, 2020 the Connecticut, Massachusetts, and Rhode Island Conferences merged to form the Southern New England Conference.

The following is a list of the conferences and headquarters locations.

Northern California Nevada -- Oakland, California
Southern California Nevada -- Altadena, California
Calvin Synod -- Hammond, Indiana NOTE: The Synod is a non-geographical judicatory composed of churches which derive from the Hungarian Reformed tradition.
Central Atlantic  -- Baltimore, Maryland
Central Pacific -- Portland, Oregon
Florida -- Orlando, Florida
Hawaii -- Honolulu, Hawaii
Illinois -- Westchester, Illinois
Illinois South -- Highland, Illinois
Indiana-Kentucky -- Indianapolis, Indiana
Iowa -- Des Moines, Iowa
Kansas-Oklahoma -- Wichita, Kansas
Maine -- Yarmouth, Maine
Michigan Conference of the United Church of Christ-- East Lansing, Michigan
Minnesota -- Minneapolis, Minnesota
Missouri Mid-South -- St. Louis, Missouri
Montana-Northern Wyoming -- Billings, Montana
Nebraska -- Lincoln, Nebraska
New Hampshire -- Pembroke, New Hampshire
New York -- East Syracuse, New York
Northern Plains -- Bismarck, North Dakota
Ohio -- Columbus, Ohio
Pacific Northwest -- Seattle, Washington
Penn Central -- Harrisburg, Pennsylvania
Penn Northeast -- Palmerton, Pennsylvania
Penn West -- Greensburg, Pennsylvania
Pennsylvania Southeast -- Pottstown, Pennsylvania
Rocky Mountain -- Denver, Colorado
South Dakota -- Sioux Falls, South Dakota
South Central -- Houston, Texas
Southeast -- Atlanta, Georgia
Southern -- Burlington, North Carolina
Southern New England -- Hartford, Connecticut and Framingham, Massachusetts
Southwest -- Phoenix, Arizona
Vermont -- Randolph, Vermont
Wisconsin -- DeForest, Wisconsin

See also
Associations of the United Church of Christ
Middle judicatory
United Church of Christ

Sources 
 http://www.ucc.org/about-us/conference/
 https://web.archive.org/web/20051026014417/http://www.ucc.org/justice/iraq1.htm
 https://web.archive.org/web/20060919153039/http://www.ncncucc.org/Pastoral%20Letter%20from%20CMs.pdf

External links
 Map of UCC Conferences 

United Church of Christ